The canton of Orange-Ouest is a French former administrative division in the department of Vaucluse and region Provence-Alpes-Côte d'Azur. It had 24,579 inhabitants (2012). It was disbanded following the French canton reorganisation which came into effect in March 2015.

Composition
The communes in the canton of Orange-Ouest:
 Caderousse 
 Châteauneuf-du-Pape 
 Orange (partly)
 Piolenc

References

Orange-Ouest
2015 disestablishments in France
States and territories disestablished in 2015